A Night at the Booty Bar is a mix album by Disco D. It is known for its explicitly sexual, vulgar lyrics.

Track listing
 "Dem Tatas (Intro)" (DJ Deeon) – 2:16 
 "Fuck Me on the Dance Floor" (Disco D, Princess Superstar) – 2:43 
 "Wait a Minute" (DJ Nasty) – 1:27 
 "Sydetrack" (Erotek) – 0:24 
 "Lola Damone Freestyle" (Disco D) – 1:15 
 "Gimme Head" (DJ Deeon) – 2:05 
 "I'm a Ho" (Disco D, DJ Slugo) – 1:40 
 "Get the F*** Up" (Waxmaster) – 1:39 
 "Booty Bar Anthem" (Disco D, DJ Profit) – 1:29 
 "Peon" (Disco D, Helluva) – 3:33 
 "Hydraulic Style" (DJ Nasty) – 1:55 
 "Peace Out" (Technician) – 1:50 
 "I Can Make You Dub" (Solace, DJ Zap) – 1:39 
 "You Need Another Drink" (Disco D, Chuck-EE) – 1:38 
 "Pump Push Pull" (DJ Nehpets) – 1:23 
 "Fuck Me Freak Me" (DJ Profit) – 1:26 
 "Hottest of the Hot [Disco D Remix]" (BG) – 4:28 
 "Suck It" (DJ Deeon) – 1:20 
 "DJs Lay It Down" (DJ Nehpets) – 0:37 
 "I Wanna Slut" (DJ Fatman) – 1:27 
 "Make Them B_T_H_S" (DJ Skip) – 0:49 
 "Ass-N-Titties" (DJ Assault) – 2:39 
 "Pussy [Disco D Remix]" (Lords Of Acid) – 2:27 
 "Detroit Zoo" (Disco D, Paradime) – 2:51 
 "Puff Puff Pass [Remix]" (DJ Nasty) – 2:25 
 "Work Them Beats" (Helluva Freestyle, Disco D) – 0:37 
 "Pushin' Dik" (DJ Deeon) – 2:14 
 "Keys to the Whip" (Disco D, Helluva, Daffney) – 1:15 
 "Keys to the Whip [Straight Pimpin' Mix]" (Disco D, Lola Damone, Helluva) – 3:46 
 "Outro" (Disco D) – 2:21

References

2003 albums
Albums produced by Disco D
Disco D albums